Matías Vicente Walker Prieto (born 19 July 1973) is a Chilean politician who currently serves as a member of the Senate of Chile. Similarly, he served as a member of the Chamber of Deputies of Chile.

On 27 October 2022, Walker resigned from the Christian Democratic Party after being a member for nearly 30 years. This stemmed from Walker's decision to support the Reject option in the 2022 Chilean national plebiscite, contrary to his party which decided to support the Approve option.

References

External links
 BCN Profile

1973 births
Living people
Chilean people of English descent
Diego Portales University alumni
University for Development alumni
Christian Democratic Party (Chile) politicians
Democrats (Chile) politicians
Senators of the LVI Legislative Period of the National Congress of Chile
Politicians from Santiago